is a Japanese Enka singer. Kazuo also has a career as a stage actor, film actor, and TV actor.

Discography 
  : the singer's debut in 1963
  : 1966

Filmography 
 Koukou San Nen Sei

TV actor 
 Taiga drama
 Akō Rōshi (1964), Yatō Emoshichi
 Minamoto no Yoshitsune (1966), Taira no Atsumori
 Haru no Sakamichi (1971), Tokugawa Tadanaga
 Motonari Mori (1997), Mukunashi Kagekatsu
 Audrey (2000–01), Kintarō Kuribe
 Mito Kōmon (2000–02), Yoichi, Tokugawa Mitsusada

External links 
 Official Homepages

Japanese male singers
Enka singers
1944 births
Japanese male stage actors
Living people
People from Ichinomiya, Aichi
Musicians from Aichi Prefecture